López Escobar may refer to:

 Julián López Escobar (born 1982), Spanish bullfighter
 Leopoldo López Escobar (1940–2013), Chilean geochemist